Norman W. Isbell (April 7, 1818 – March 10, 1865) was a justice of the Iowa Supreme Court from January 16, 1855, to June 2, 1856, appointed from Linn County, Iowa.

Born in Charlton, New York, Isbell read law to be admitted to the bar in 1839. He moved west due to poor health, first to Keytesville, Missouri in 1842, and later to Marion, Iowa in 1845.

After a short stint on the Supreme Court, his health forced him to resign. He later served briefly as a Linn County District Court judge, from 1862 to 1864, where he controversially ruled that Iowans stationed in other states while serving as soldiers in the American Civil War could not constitutionally vote in the state's elections. In 1864, he moved to California, where he resided until his death, in  Napa, California.

References

Justices of the Iowa Supreme Court
1818 births
1865 deaths
U.S. state supreme court judges admitted to the practice of law by reading law
People from Charlton, New York
People from Keytesville, Missouri
People from Marion, Iowa
19th-century American judges